Marcello Cottafava (born 8 September 1977) is an Italian footballer who plays as a defender.

He measures 184 cm, weighing 77 kg.

Career
He started his career at Sampdoria, arriving in the first team in 1996, but failed to collect appearances in Serie A. From 1997 to 2004 he played in Serie C1 with Saronno, Carrarese, Lecco, Treviso and Giulianova.

Treviso
He returned to Treviso in 2004, playing in Serie B and the following year in Serie A, where he debuted on 11 September 2005 in Treviso 0-1 Livorno.

Lecce
The 2006-07 season began with Treviso, in the cadet series, and he moved to Lecce, again in B, in January. He started for the rest of the league, until he was cautioned for an alleged doping case. On 21 June he was acquitted for not committing the crime: he had used a nasal spray, which had caused an alleged doping effect.
In the 2007-2008 season he scored a valuable mark by pulling from about thirty meters against Pisa, for the momentary 1-0. The game then ends with a 1-1 result.

Triestina
On 1 September 2008 he moved to Triestina, where he scored 3 goals in 77 appearances in two seasons. In the pre-season of the 2010-11 season he was put out of the squad by Triestina and then reinstated in January. In July, he rescinded his contract with the halberd company.

Gubbio
On 22 September 2011 he was hired by Gubbio. On 5 October 2011, he scored his first goal for Eugubini in a 2-2 match against Brescia. On November 5, he recovered his first expulsion in a 3-1 defeat against L.R. Vicenza at 58 minutes, with the result still 1-1. He finished the season relegating with 34 appearances and 2 goals.

Latina
On 29 August 2012, he signed an annual contract with Latina.[7] On September 30, 2012 in Viareggio-Latina scored a valuable mark by kicking a penalty of about 40 meters that surprises the goalkeeper opponent signing the temporary advantage of the team Pontine. The game will then end with a 1-1 result. He is among the protagonists of the Pontine team that on June 16, 2013, beating Pisa 3-1 in the Playoff final of the League First Division, conquers the first historic promotion in Serie B.
On 10 July 2013 he renewed for a year participating in the first B series championship in the history of Latina.
On 14 December 2013 in the match against Crotone found his first goal of the season with a diagonal shot on the developments of a corner.
He became captain of the team that finished third in the standings behind Empoli and Palermo. He participated in the playoffs to go to Serie A. He won the semi-final with in Bari losing only the final against Cesena not being able to crown the dream of double promotion.

S.P.A.L.
On 14 January 2015 he joined SPAL, a militant formation in Lega Pro[8]. On 23 April 2016, in the match that saw the Estensi play against Arezzo, finished 1 to 1 won the Lega Pro championship and in a press conference on 14 May 2016 announced his retirement from football played.

Coach
In 2016-2017 he coached the SPAL Under 17 in the year of promotion to Serie A.
Promoted in Spring, on September 7, 2017 he successfully passed the second-category UEFA A coaching exam that allows him to train all the youth and to be deputy in A and B.[9] In the Spring 2 Championship 2017-2018 he placed fifth at a point from the playoffs
The following year he finished second in Group A and finally lost the play-off final against Lazio.
On July 1, 2019, he became coach of Sampdoria’s Primavera side, signing a contract until June 30, 2020. With the suspension of the championship due to the emergency COVID-19 the team stops at the 7th place in the standings in the play-off area. In the summer of 2020, Cottafava moved to coach Torino’s peers.

References

External links

gazzetta.it

Italian footballers
Calcio Lecco 1912 players
Treviso F.B.C. 1993 players
Giulianova Calcio players
U.S. Lecce players
U.S. Triestina Calcio 1918 players
A.S. Gubbio 1910 players
Latina Calcio 1932 players
Serie A players
Association football defenders
Footballers from Genoa
1977 births
Living people